Yoav Kutner (born 18 May 1954) is an Israeli music editor, TV and radio presenter, who has significantly promoted performers ranging from Mashina to Radiohead.

Life
Yoav Kutner was born in Jerusalem, Israel on May 18, 1954. At the age of seventeen, while on vacation in Switzerland he was involved in an accident while climbing a mountain. This resulted in a significant loss of his past memories. Later in life he married and had three children.

Yoav Kutner lives and works in Tel Aviv, Israel.

Work

Radio
Kutner edited and presented radio shows in the Israel Defense Forces Radio from December 1974 to December 1993, and from 1985 onwards had his own daily show. He edited hundreds of other music shows among them "The Magical Mystery Tour" (מסע הקסם המסתורי), a 60-hour radio show exploring the history of The Beatles. 
As a radio editor, Kutner was always in the search for new stimulating music. He promoted numerous artists in his radio shows, and in the case of Radiohead a local representative of EMI had introduced the song Creep to him. Kutner played it incessantly on the radio. The song became a hit and following that Radiohead was invited to Tel Aviv to their first gig outside the UK.

In an interview with Assaf Nevo he said "The attempts to widen the mainstream and to enable musicians to move from the margins to the center had been my mission since I've been dealing with music".

TV
Kutner founded the "Pop Corner" in the legendary TV show Zehu Ze! from 1978 to 1996. Through live shows of guest artists and video clips he exposed the audience to new music on a weekly basis. In 1998 he edited and presented "Sof Onat HaTapuzim", a TV series exploring the history of Israeli rock.

In 2003 Kutner has been among the founders and Editor-in-Chief of "24"- the Israeli TV music channel. He left the channel in 2007.

Journalism
From 1981 to 1997, Kutner wrote about music in "7 Days", Israel's weekly journal of the daily Yedioth Ahronoth.

Internet
Kutner was among the founders of Mooma, a website dedicated to Israeli music and he has written many biographies and discographies of the artists in the site.

Honours
Kutner was awarded several prizes for his programs. For "Paul McCartney is Dead" a prize from the Israel Defense Forces Radio (1978) and the Tamuz Prize for "Sof Onat HaTapuzim", a TV series exploring the history of Israeli rock broadcast on Channel 1.

References

External links

The Little Man from the Radio in Facebook (Hebrew)

1954 births
Israeli DJs
Israeli radio presenters
Israeli television presenters
Living people
Israeli Jews
People from Tel Aviv